Hadad the Edomite is a character mentioned in the First Book of Kings who was an adversary of King Solomon after Solomon turned to idols. Some scholars believe the text should read Hadad the Aramean.

According to the account in 1 Kings, Hadad was a survivor of the royal house of Edom after the slaughter at the hands of Joab. He escaped as a child to Egypt, where he was raised by Pharaoh and married the queen's sister. After the death of King David, Hadad returned to try to reclaim the throne of Edom. Hadad's campaign to recapture Edom apparently met with success, as  states that another of Solomon's adversaries, Rezon the son of Eliada, did harm to Solomon "as Hadad did".

Hadad did "evil" to King Solomon after gathering together a "marauding band"; Hadad "abhorred Israel and reigned over Aram (Syria)".  Further, an Edomite princess is listed among the wives of King Solomon.

Along with Rezon the Syrian, Hadad is one of two characters described as a satan to Solomon, a word which was left untranslated and transliterated into Greek letters in the Septuagint.

References

10th-century BCE Hebrew people
Solomon
Books of Kings people
Edomite people